The Diving competition in the 1995 Summer Universiade were held in Fukuoka, Japan.

Medal overview

Medal table

References
 

1995 Summer Universiade
1995
1995 in diving